Memphis Beat is an American crime comedy-drama television series created by Joshua Harto and Liz W. Garcia that aired on TNT from June 22, 2010 to August 16, 2011, with a total of 20 episodes spanning two seasons. It was produced by Smokehouse Productions, in association with Warner Horizon Television.

On October 14, 2011 TNT canceled the series of Memphis Beat after two seasons.

Overview
The show follows Dwight Hendricks (Jason Lee), a police detective assigned to the General Assignment division of the MPD, who loves his mother, the blues, his city, and Elvis Presley and calls himself "the keeper of Memphis". His passionate devotion to his hometown is offset by his relaxed approach to his job, an attitude that frustrates by-the-book Lt. Tanya Rice (Alfre Woodard), his new boss.

Cast and characters
Jason Lee as Detective Dwight Hendricks
Alfre Woodard as Lieutenant Tanya Rice
Sam Hennings as Detective Charles "Whitehead" White
DJ Qualls as Police Officer Davey Sutton
Celia Weston as Paula Ann Hendricks
Leonard Earl Howze as Detective Reginald Greenback
Abraham Benrubi as Sgt. JC Lightfoot (Season 1)

Development and production
Jason Lee said he was drawn to the show because the concept was original and the protagonist was fun to play. Lee said, "The whole package was unique and once I came to found the character and the material and the scenarios and his relationships and he's such a great guy and is so multi-layered and cares such a great deal for his city and his family and the people that he's protecting." Lee listened to hundreds of Presley songs in preparation for the role, and said his respect for the artist grew as a result.  The vocals for Lee's character are sung by Mark Arnell.

The title Delta Blues was originally considered, but it was eventually changed to Memphis Beat. The show was created by married couple Joshua Harto and Liz W. Garcia, with actor George Clooney and his production partner writer/actor/director Grant Heslov serving as executive producers. Harto and Garcia wrote the first two episodes of the series. Liz Garcia said of the show, "Broadcast TV is being influenced by cable in so many ways in terms of reinventing genres and taking chances, and this is part of it. ... The forefront of creativity is on cable TV."

Despite the show's setting, the first season was primarily filmed in Laplace, LA and New Orleans, LA with only some key locations and exteriors filmed in Memphis.  This has largely been attributed to the better tax incentives by filming in a state other than Tennessee.

On September 16, 2010, TNT announced that Memphis Beat was renewed for a second season, the first episode of which was broadcast June 14, 2011.

On October 17, 2011, TNT decided not to pick up a third season of Memphis Beat.

Episodes

Series overview

Season 1 (2010)

Season 2 (2011)

Reception

Critical reception
On Metacritic season 1 has a score of 56% based on 18 reviews, indicating "mixed or average reviews". On Rotten Tomatoes season 1 has an approval rating of 38% based on reviews from 24 critics.
The New York Times said of the pilot episode "This series is to Memphis what the HBO series 'Treme' is to New Orleans and 'Justified' on FX is to Harlan County in Kentucky—timeless indigenous music is set against the exoticism of temporal subcultures". The New York Daily News gave another positive review saying that "TNT's new 'Memphis Beat' has a great soundtrack and a pretty good cop drama in between". The Hollywood Reporter also gave the pilot a positive review:

But even as the cop genre seems beyond saturation, along comes TNT's Memphis Beat, a series with a fresh character in a fresh environment with a fresh look and sound that proves, against all odds, that good actors and agile execution trump format every time.

Awards and nominations

International broadcasting

References

External links
 
 

2010s American comedy-drama television series
2010s American crime drama television series
2010s American mystery television series
2010s American police comedy television series
2010s American police procedural television series
2010 American television series debuts
2011 American television series endings
American action television series
English-language television shows
Films shot in New Orleans
Television shows set in Tennessee
TNT (American TV network) original programming
Television series by Warner Horizon Television
American action comedy television series